Radio West Middlesex is the volunteer-run hospital radio station of the West Middlesex Hospital in Isleworth, Middlesex. It broadcasts to the patients of the hospital online.

Radio West Middlesex has been broadcast in the West Middlesex University Hospital since 1967. It began broadcasting 24 hours a day in 2003.

The station was the winner of the Station of the Year Bronze award at the Hospital Broadcasting Awards in 2007 and was commended at 2008 Hospital Broadcasting Awards in the same category.

Patients can request music on the 4 weekly request programmes via the  station's website, by text, email or telephone.

Radio West Middlesex is a registered charity, number 1050841.

External links 
 
Hospital Broadcasting Association website

Radio stations in London
Hospital radio stations
Radio stations established in 1967